The 2014–15 season was Klubi i Futbollit Tirana's 76th competitive season, 76th consecutive season in the Kategoria Superiore and 94th year in existence as a football club.

Season overview

June
Veteran Elvis Sina announced his retirement at the previous season, ending his 15 years as a professional footballer as the most-capped player. On 4 June, the first choice goalkeeper Ilion Lika left the club to sign with Flamurtari Vlorë a two-year contract as a free agent. One day later, Tirana released defender Blerim Kotobelli, who later went on to join fellow top flight side Teuta Durrës. On 15 June, Tirana announced the signing of Bylis Ballsh prodigy Stivi Frashëri for an undisclosed fee, with the transfer who become effective from 1 July. On 21 June, Mensur Limani was released the club directors decided not to give him a new contract.

July
On 1 July, Tirana signed the Shkëndija Tiranë duo David Domgjoni and Alush Gavazaj; both players joined by penning a contract until 2019. Two days later, Tirana purchased Argjend Malaj from Kosovan side Prishtina; the 19-year old midfielder signed a one-year contract with the option of another year at the end of the season. On 5 July, Tirana reinforced the team by signing with Rwanda national team forward Meddie Kagere for $10,000; he signed a two-year contract. On 11 July, Tirana completed the transfer of another striker; Tomislav Bušić joined the team on a one-year contract with an option of a further one. Three days later, Ervin Bulku returned to the club after seven years and signed a two-year contract, keeping his promise that he made years ago. Also during this day, Erando Karabeci and Mario Morina extended their contracts for another season. 

On 16 July, Ivan Delić, who played a vital role in the last season, left the team to return in his home country to sign with Lovćen. On 19 July, Elis Bakaj, without playing a single minute for Skënderbeu Korçë, left the club and signed a two-year contract with Tirana, where he was assigned the vacant number 19. Five days later, Tirana signed even his cousin, the goalkeeper Edvan Bakaj from Laçi, who signed a two-year contract and picked up the number 31. Tirana continued to be active in mercato by signing Albanian international player Debatik Curri, who was a free agent. On 29 July, Tirana signed on a three-year deal the left-back Endrit Idrizaj from Bylis Ballsh for an undisclosed fee and also released Mirel Çota who signed with newly promoted side Elbasani.

August
On 1 August, Tirana send the young goalkeeper Xhino Sejdo on loan to Albanian First Division side Kamza until the end of the season. As a sign of respect to Bulku, Karabeci handed his captaincy and became the vice-captain instead. On 7 August, Ervis Kaja left the team to return to Laçi, whilst Gilberto Fortunato announced his departure after much controversies about his wage. On 21 August, Renato Hyshmeri signed a one-year contract with the club, becoming the 12th signing of the summer transfer window.

Tirana started the 2014–15 Kategoria Superiore season in strong fashion by thrashing 3–0 at home the newly promoted side Apolonia Fier, with Bakaj and Hyshmeri who scored their first goals. On 27 August, Tirana loaned Ardit Peposhi, Erion Hoxhallari and Erlind Koreshi to fellow Kategoria Superiore side Teuta Durrës until the end of the season. Three days later, Tirana grabbed its second league victory in two matches by beating 1–0 at home the title contenders Flamurtari Vlorë thanks to an Ilion Lika owngoal.

September
In the third league match against Vllaznia Shkodër on 11 September, Tirana didn't go more than a 1–1 draw; they scored a last-minute equalizer with Ervin Bulku. The match was infamously marred by crowd trouble which saw 13 people arrested and both clubs' fans receiving lengthy stadium bans. Tirana ended September in first place after a win against Elbasani, a loss to Laçi and a draw against cross-town rivals of Partizani Tirana.

October
Tirana begun October by visiting Sopoti Librazhd at Sopoti Stadium for the first leg of 2014–15 Albanian Cup; the team won 3–0 at Sopoti Stadium thanks to a Tomislav Bušić brace which was followed by the third goal of youngster Grend Halili goal. On 4 October, Tirana recorded another goalless draw, this time at Skënderbeu Korçë. In the next round, Tirana won 3–1 at home against title challengers Kukësi, This win was followed by another one at Teuta Durrës in the final round of first phase. Tirana ended the first phase on first place tied on points with Partizani. 

Tirana started the second phase by recording a 3–0 home at Apolonia Fier to keep the first place. On 22 October, in the returning leg of Albanian Cup first round against Sopoti Librazhd at Selman Stërmasi Stadium, Tirana didn't go more than a 1–1 draw but advanced to the next round with the aggregate 4–1.

November
Tirana kicked off November with a disappointing goalless draw against Flamurtari Vlorë. Against Bylis Ballsh in the first leg of Albanian Cup's second round, Tirana won thanks to a Tomislav Bušić winner. On 8 November, in the next league match against Vllaznia Shkodër at home, Tirana won 1–0 to retake the championship lead. On 20 November, in the second leg of cup versus Bylis Ballsh, Tirana recorded their largest win of the season by thrashing Bylis 6–0 at Selman Stërmasi Stadium. Only three days later, Tirana recorded their second championship win for November by winning 3–2 over relegation strugglers Elbasani; the team only in the last moments thanks to a Selemani Ndikumana winner.

December
Tirana started December in the worst way possible by losing in the Capital Derby against Partizani Tirana 2–0. Five days later, Tirana bounced back by beating Skënderbeu Korçë 2–0 at Qemal Stafa Stadium thanks to Ndikumana, who scored both goals. However, four days later, Tirana suffered another loss, this time at the hands of Kukësi; it was Vilfor Hysa's early goal which decided the game. Tirana returned to the winning ways in the last match of the year, where Gugash Magani side trashed 4–2 Teuta Durrës at home; this match saw the return of the fans in the stands after the suspension. Tirana ended the year in the 4th place. On 28 December, Francis Olaki and Meddie Kagere were released by Tirana after terminating their contract by mutual consensus.

January
On 6 January, Muzaka returned to Tirana after five years absence, signing a contract until the end of the 2014–15 season, reportedly worth €5,500 a month. On 7 January he was officially unveiled as a Tirana player to the media, holding a press conference alongside the club's president Refik Halili and newly appointed director Devi Muka. Two days later, Tirana purchased Macedonia international player Kire Ristevski on an 18-month contract. On 10 January, Tirana agreed terms with Jetmir Sefa, purchasing him from Laçi for a reported nominal fee of €2,150. On 14 January, Lladrovci went to a trial with Tirana which he successfully passed and signed a pre-contract, but was sent on loan at his previous club Feronikeli until the end of the season. On 24 January, in the first competitive match of 2016, Tirana beat 2–0 Apolonia Fier at the neutral stadium of Niko Dovana Stadium thanks to a Ndikumana brace. The match was played at Niko Dovana Stadium due to reconstruction of the field of Qemal Stafa Stadium. Four days later, Endrit Idrizaj agreed terms with Apolonia Fier to join them on loan until the end of the season.

February
On 4 February, Tirana went against Apolonia Fier in the first leg of the Albanian Cup quarter-final; Apolonia surprised by scoring twice in the first half, however the goals from Morina and Karabeci held Tirana to a draw. Four days later, Tirana won 0–1 away against Vllaznia Shkodër thanks to an Elis Bakaj strike in the 91st minute to help Tirana to regain the first place. On 14 February, Tirana recorded its fifth consecutive league victory by beating Elbasani 2–0 at Redi Maloku Stadium thanks to the Sefa and Bakaj goals. On 18 February, in the returning leg of Albanian Cup quarter-final, Tirana won easily 3–0 away to progress in the next round with the aggregate 5–2. Following this win, for Tirana would come a series of negative results such as the 3–0 away loss to Laçi.

March
Tirana kicked off March by losing 1–0 against Skënderbeu Korçë. On 8 March, Tirana returned to the winning ways by defeating the title contenders Kukësi 2–0 at Niko Dovana Stadium thanks to the goals of Tomislav Bušić and Gjergji Muzaka, who scored for the first time since his return to the club. However, this win did not bring joy to the team as they lost the postponed Capital Derby for the second consecutive time against Partizani Tirana; the Red Bulls won 2–1. The team's goalkeeper Stivi Frashëri criticised too much after the match, where also the coach Gugash Magani declared that Frashëri can not cope with such pressure match. Tirana ended the third phase of championship by taking a goalless draw with the struggling side Teuta Durrës. Tirana started the fourth and the last phase on strong fashion, winning 2–0 at Apolonia with the goals of Morina and Muça.

April
The month started on 4 April with a 1–2 away win over Flamurtari Vlorë with the goals scored by Muça and Bušić. Four days later, in the first leg of Albanian Cup semi-final, Tirana was unable to break the fortitude of Laçi as they drew 0–0 at Qemal Stafa Stadium in front of more than 2,000 fans. In the next league match against Vllaznia Shkodër on 12th, Tirana were behind in the 33rd following the superb goal of Eraldo Çinari, but they responded in the second half with two goals of Muça, who scored his first career brace. After the match, he dedicated the goals to the Tirana ultras, Geri Allkaj, who died in a car accident two days before. Tirana continues its good run in league by beating 3–1 away Elbasani with the goals of Hyshmeri, Bušić and Bakaj. On 22 April, in the returning leg of Albanian Cup semi-final, Tirana fell to Laçi by losing 1–0 thanks to the winner of James Adeniyi. This match saw Tirana playing with ten players following the exclusion of Ndikumana in the 16th minute following a brawl with Olsi Teqja, who was only yellow-carded. Teqja also injured the knee of Gjergji Muzaka in the 42nd minute of the match, and he soon needed surgery on his knee. He undergo the surgery on 11 May in Rome, and started recovering from his knee injury in Greece. On 26 April, in the last league match for this month, Tirana finally prevail over Laçi by beating them 1–0 at Qemal Stafa Stadium thanks to late goal of Francis Kahata.

May
In the last derby of the season against Partizani Tirana, Tirana drew 2–2 after taking the advantage in the 34th minute with Elis Bakaj, who scored even the second goal. This draw shattered the club hopes of winning the title, as Skënderbeu cemented its first spot with five points gap and with only three matches to go. Five days later, in the next league match exactly against Skënderbeu, Tirana didn't go more than a goalless draw as Skënderbeu received what they come for. This with precious draw, Skënderbeu assured mathematically the 5th consecutive league title, as Tirana went trophyless for the third year in a row. 

Now that the "league goal" was gone, the only goal left for Tirana was to qualify in the European competitions, but to achieve this they had to beat Kukësi in the penultimate championship round. However, for Tirana thing went from bad to worse as they were thrashed 4–1 by Kukësi at Zeqir Ymeri Stadium thanks to the goal of Hysa and hat-trick of Pero Pejić. This heavy lose forced the coach Gugash Magani to resign after more than a year in change. He was temporarily replaced by his assistant Ndubuisi Egbo for the final championship round, in which Tirana won 1–0 against Teuta Durrës thanks to the late winner of Elis Bakaj. Tirana ended the season in disappointment, in an eventual 4th league place and an Albanian Cup semi-final exit to Laçi.

Players

Squad information

Transfers

In

Summer

Winter

Out

Summer

Winter

Pre-season and friendlies

Competitions

Kategoria Superiore

League table

Results summary

Results by round

Matches

Albanian Cup

First round

Second round

Quarter-finals

Semi-finals

Statistics

Squad stats
{|class="wikitable" style="text-align: center;"
|-
!
! style="width:70px;"|League
! style="width:70px;"|Cup
! style="width:70px;"|Total Stats
|-
|align=left|Games played       ||36||8 || 44
|-
|align=left|Games won          ||21||4 || 25
|-
|align=left|Games drawn        ||8 ||3 || 11
|-
|align=left|Games lost         ||7 ||1 || 8 
|-
|align=left|Goals scored       ||47||16|| 63
|-
|align=left|Goals conceded     ||27||4 || 31
|-
|align=left|Goal difference    ||20||12|| 32
|-
|align=left|Clean sheets       ||20||5 || 25
|-

Top scorers

Last updated: 22 May 2015

Clean sheets
The list is sorted by shirt number when total appearances are equal.

Last updated: 22 May 2015

References

External links
Official website

KF Tirana seasons
Tirana